The Missouri Baptist Convention is the state convention of Southern Baptists in Missouri. Headquartered in Jefferson City, it operates as a network of nearly 1,800 independent Southern Baptist churches, which are divided into eight regions and 60 Baptist associations. Missouri Baptists elect an executive board that oversees the convention's ministries, which in turn are carried out by the Missouri Baptist Convention staff.

Leadership

Convention officers
Missouri Baptist churches send messengers to an annual meeting to nominate and elect convention officers. The 2020–2021 convention officers are:

President: Jon Nelson
First Vice President: Chris Williams
Second Vice President: Lane Harrison
Recording Secretary: Jason Marlin

Executive board
The executive board is responsible for overseeing the missionary, educational, and benevolent work of the convention. Messengers from Missouri Baptist Convention churches elect board members from each of the state's eight regions to serve three-year terms.

Executive director
The executive director is elected by the executive board. On October 13, 2011, John Yeats was elected the 20th executive director of the convention.

Missouri Baptist Ministries
The Missouri Baptist Convention staff is engaged in more than a dozen ministries under the administration of five strategic groups:

Making Disciples. Ministries include evangelism; strategies for church leaders and families and age-graded training events and conferences.

Multiplying Churches. Ministries include discovering multiplying churches, sending churches, and church multipliers; training sending churches; mentoring, assessing, and training church multipliers; deploying church multipliers throughout Missouri, across the U.S., and around the world; and partnership missions.

Developing Leaders. Ministries include a statewide network of local church leaders, associational leaders, and convention staff members who work together to provide pastoral leader development and care; church revitalization; transitional pastor training; and disaster relief training and deployment.

Collegiate Ministries. These include ministries on 25 Missouri campuses; training events for collegiate leaders; a summer missions and mentoring initiative; international student ministry; equipping churches to reach out to nearby campuses; developing leaders to serve on new campuses; and coordinating mission experiences for students.

Executive Office. These include the office of the executive director,; business services; property management; and the office of The Pathway, the official news journal of Missouri Baptists

Ministry Support. Ministries include creative services (graphic design, web and social media, and video); live-event support; technology; and Christian apologetics.

Funding
Funding for the Missouri Baptist Convention is provided primarily through the Cooperative Program (CP). Missouri Baptist churches give a percentage of their budget to the Missouri Baptist Convention. Sixty percent of these funds stay in the state, while 40 percent is passed on to the Southern Baptist Convention for ministries conducted by the North American Mission Board, the International Mission Board, and others.

Affiliated organizations
 Baptist Home
 Hannibal-LaGrange University
 Missouri Baptist Foundation
 Missouri Baptist Children's Home
 Missouri Baptist University
 Southwest Baptist University

External links 
 Missouri Baptist Convention official website
 The Pathway (Baptist State Newspaper) Website
 Southern Baptist Convention Website

References

Baptist Christianity in Missouri
Conventions associated with the Southern Baptist Convention